The Cape Verde Confederation of Free Trade Unions (CCSL) is a national trade union centre in Cape Verde.

In July 2017, CCSL and UNTC-CS (National Union of Workers of Cabo Verde) signed an agreement with the government to promote social peace and increase national minimum wage from EUR 108 to EUR 135 by 2020.

References

Trade unions in Cape Verde